Raúl Omar Fernández Valverde (born 6 October 1985 in Lima, Peru) is a professional Peruvian footballer who currently plays as a goalkeeper for Atlético Grau in the Peruvian first division league.

Club career

Universitario de Deportes
Fernández got his start in the youth system of Universitario de Deportes. He made his professional debut with the club in a 1–1 draw with Unión Huaral on 31 July 2005.

He spent half of the 2006 season playing for Sport Áncash but returned to Universitario the following season.

After Juan Flores left Universitario to sign with Cienciano for the 2007 season, José Carvallo took over as the team's starting goalkeeper over Fernández. On 22 September 2007, the coach, Julio Gómez, decided to give Fernández his first start of the season against Total Clean. Universitario won the match 0–1 and Fernández became the starting goalkeeper for the team after that game.

In 2008, Fernández helped his team win the Torneo Apertura 2008, with Ricardo Gareca as his coach. His strong performances earned him the nickname 'Superman' and he was chosen as the Goalkeeper of the Year for the 2008 season.

In 2009, Universitario won the 2009 Torneo Descentralizado after defeating their local rival, Alianza Lima, in a playoff series to conclude a season where Fernández was considered a key factor for the team's success. His performances throughout the year, especially in the first playoff game against Alianza Lima got the attention of international scouts who would later contact him from various clubs in Europe. He was named the Goalkeeper of the Year and Player of the Year for the 2009 Peruvian domestic league.

OGC Nice 
Fernández signed with French club OGC Nice in December 2010. However, Universitario de Deportes opted to take him on loan for the first six months of his deal. He made his debut for Nice in the third round of the 2011–12 Coupe de la Ligue, in a 1–2 victory against Toulouse. He was Nice's match hero against Dijon when he stopped a penalty during shoot-outs to help his team advance to the semifinals of the same tournament. He had limited appearances during his time with the club, who had David Ospina as their starting goalkeeper.

FC Dallas 
Fernández signed with FC Dallas on 10 January 2013. He made his regular-season debut on the club's opening match for the 2013 season in a 1–0 victory versus Colorado Rapids. Due to his good performances for the club, he was voted by the fans to be the starting goalkeeper for the MLS All-Stars roster in the 2013 MLS All-Star Game. After two seasons with Dallas, Fernández was released at the end of the 2014 season following the team's acquisition of Dan Kennedy.

Universitario de Deportes
Fernández returned to Universitario after signing a four-year contract in January 2015. In 2016, playing against Juan Aurich, he crashed with a teammate and suffered a knee injury that kept him sidelined for months. Despite the absence of Fernández, Universitario won the 2016 Torneo Apertura with Carlos Cáceda taking over as the new starting goalkeeper. He was heavily blamed for Universitario's exit from the 2018 Copa Libertadores after a costly error on the final minutes of the second leg game of the first stage allowed Oriente Petrolero to score an away goal that would eliminate the team from advancing to the second stage.

Universidad César Vallejo
In January 2019, Fernández signed for the recently promoted Universidad César Vallejo and reunited with former head coach José del Solar.

Deportivo Binacional
On 11 January 2020, Fernández signed for the reigning Peruvian Liga 1 champions Deportivo Binacional.

International career
Fernández was first called up to play for Peru by José del Solar in March 2008 for a friendly match against Costa Rica. He made his debut in the final minutes of that match, subbing in for George Forsyth. Del Solar called up Fernández for some of Peru's 2010 FIFA World Cup CONMEBOL qualification campaign but only used him for one match, against Ecuador in a 1–2 loss. After Del Solar's departure from the national team, Sergio Markarian was appointed as the new manager. Fernández was called up by Markarian for a series of friendly games in 2010 and 2011, including the 2011 Kirin Cup in Japan. He was also part of Peru's squad for the 2011 Copa América in Argentina, in which he helped Peru finish third place. For the 2014 FIFA World Cup CONMEBOL qualification campaign, Fernández played in 11 of Peru's matches. After Markarian left the national team, new interim head coach Pablo Bengoechea called up Fernández for some of Peru's friendly matches in 2014. Fernández's last appearance for Peru was in a friendly match against Chile, in which Peru lost 0–3. In total, Fernández has made 29 appearances for the national team and has recorded 14 clean sheets.

Career statistics

Club

International

Honours

Club
Universitario de Deportes
 Torneo Apertura: 2008; 2016
 Torneo Descentralizado: 2009

Country
Peru
 Copa América Third place – Bronze medal: 2011

Individual
 Peruvian First Division Goalkeeper of the Year: 2008; 2009
 Peruvian First Division Player of the Year: 2009
 MLS All-Star: 2013

References

External links

 
 
 Facebook 

1985 births
Living people
Footballers from Lima
Association football goalkeepers
Peruvian footballers
Peru international footballers
Peruvian expatriate footballers
Club Universitario de Deportes footballers
Sport Áncash footballers
OGC Nice players
Club Deportivo Universidad César Vallejo footballers
Peruvian Primera División players
Ligue 1 players
Major League Soccer players
Major League Soccer All-Stars
Expatriate footballers in France
Expatriate soccer players in the United States
2011 Copa América players
Peruvian expatriate sportspeople in France
Peruvian expatriate sportspeople in the United States
FC Dallas players